Seventeen ships of the French Navy have been named Rubis ("Ruby"),  or Ruby as it was spelled until the 18th century:

 , a 48-gun ship of the line.
 HMS Ruby (1666), originally Rubis, a 64-gun ship of the line, captured in 1666, taken into service as HMS Ruby. She was hulked after sustaining storm damage in 1682 and broken up in 1685.
 , a 70-gun ship of the line, broken up in 1700.
 , a 50-gun ship of the line.
 , a fireship.
 , a 54-gun ship of the line, hulked in 1722.
 , a 56-gun ship of the line, broken up in 1729
 , a 56-gun ship of the line, formerly HMS Ruby captured by Mars in 1707. Broken up in 1708.
 , a gunboat.
 , a 52-gun ship of the line, captured in 1747 and taken into service as HMS Rubis and condemned in 1748.
 , a 20-gun corvette, broken up in 1748.
 , a 26-gun ship, condemned in 1747.
 , a 40-gun frigate. She ran aground in 1813 and was burnt to prevent capture.
 , a paddle corvette.
 , a gunboat.
 , a  minelaying submarine. She was sunk in 1958 to be used as a sonar target.
 , a nuclear attack submarine and lead ship of her class.
 , the fifth planned  nuclear attack submarine

See also

Sources and references
 Les bâtiments ayant porté le nom de Rubis
 

French Navy ship names